The Jacksonville Riverwalks are a network of multi-use trails and open space developments along both the north and south banks of the St. Johns River in Jacksonville, Florida. The roughly  Downtown Northbank portion travels alongside the Hyatt Regency Jacksonville, Jacksonville Landing, Times-Union Center for the Performing Arts, CSX Transportation Building, and extends into the Brooklyn district. The  Southbank portion of the trail connects local landmarks such as Friendship Fountain, Museum of Science and History and Riverplace Tower.

History

The first section of the Riverwalk opened on the Downtown Southbank on November 8, 1985. It was intended as a venue where tourists and local residents alike could view the beauty of the river and the skyline of the city. On a sunny day, the view from the walk includes shimmering water, shiny buildings, sailboats & speedboats. The  walk was designed by Perkins & Perkins Architects to be a festive waterfront public space linking Friendship Fountain and Harbormasters Restaurant (now River City Brewing Co.) with hotels and office buildings east of the Main Street Bridge. Friendship Park Fountain was built in 1965 and became one of the most recognizable landmarks in the city. A graphic system was developed and, included banners, kiosks and signage to provide visitors with clear and legible information, as well as reinforce the warm and lively image of the riverwalk.

A few of the project were built but scaled back. The St. Johns Wharf was a planned open-air marketplace to be built over the river adjacent to the Wyndham Hotel. A few shops were built along the riverwalk, but the wharf was never constructed. Four open air pavilions were planned and projected to include concessions and restroom facilities. only two were constructed. The Ship Museum, an attraction to emphasize the historic relationship between the city and the river; projected to include floating ship exhibits, was scaled back to the current Jacksonville Maritime Museum, now closed. Multiple projects did not come to fruition. The Grove, a raised grass seating area shaded by a grove of palm trees; The Pyramid, an outdoor structure with terraced seating area for special events; An Aquarium located south of the maritime museum, facing Friendship Fountain, which would showcase local freshwater and saltwater marine life; A Great Lawn for recreation and relaxation; A sidewalk café under the bridge that would link both sides of riverwalk; A 3,000-seat open-air amphitheater with bandstand and theatrical lighting, built out into the river that would be used for public concerts, ballets, festivals and school graduations.

In January, 2005, a ribbon-cutting ceremony was held to celebrate the opening of the latest extension of the Northbank Riverwalk. The landscaped brick walkway connects the existing Riverwalk at the CSX building to Riverside Avenue. Its features include historical lighting, water fountains, trash receptacles, bike racks, irrigated landscaping and over 100 benches.

Nearly 40 feet of Riverwalk was temporarily closed in late 2006 when corrosion caused steel pilings to fail and the supported walkway buckled. The city allocated $1.3 million to inspect the entire Riverwalk and make emergency repairs, and planned a multi-year capital improvement project eventually costing $25 million for upgrades split between both riverwalks. As part of that project, the city began installing 306 pile jackets in and around the area of the 2006 closure at a cost of $1.4 million.

At the January 31, 2008 meeting of the Downtown Development Review Board (DDRB) of the Jacksonville Economic Development Commission (JEDC), plans were tentatively approved for a 128-slip dockage facility to be named, The South Shore Marina & Riverwalk at the Aetna Building. The project would include a new section of southbank riverwalk on the  Aetna Building property, which has  of riverfrontage. Permits from the Florida Department of Environmental Protection and the United States Army Corps of Engineers had already been obtained, but financial conditions forced the project to be placed on hold.

The City of Jacksonville and Fidelity National Financial executed a land swap in 2008 that added  in exchange for the parcel of land under Riverside Avenue's historic fire station. The city has the option to move the structure before it can be demolished, and funding for that purpose is being discussed.

The Riverside Arts Market (RAM) was begun in 2008 beneath the Fuller Warren Bridge around the Northbank Riverwalk. It is open on Saturdays, 10-4 from March to December and features an eclectic mix of vendors offering arts and crafts, food and drink, fruits and vegetables and live entertainment in a family-friendly environment. Eight of the market's vendors have subsequently opened brick & mortar stores or restaurants.

In late June 2009, a 12-foot corner section of concrete walkway on the northbank collapsed due to erosion of the steel bulkhead. Another portion of the riverwalk was closed after bricks became loose when the walkway sank several inches. Repairs to both damaged areas were completed prior to the July 4th celebration and fireworks show.

A meeting was held in January, 2010 between Mayor John Peyton and several city councilmen to discuss progress on three major downtown improvement projects, including Southbank Riverwalk replacement. Legislation was filed to fund these three projects with a price tag of $23 million. $11.9 million was allocated to replace the wooden structure with a more durable material with a 40-year life span, and upgrade lighting, railing and trash receptacles. On February 9, 2010 the city council passed the three bills without debate, providing final approval for all three projects.

As of late 2011, the Northbank Riverwalk ran from the Fuller Warren Bridge to the former Shipyards property, owned by the city of Jacksonville. There are plans to extend it west to Riverside's Memorial Park, and east to Metropolitan Park across from the stadium. Free parking exists under the Fuller Warren Bridge.    
The center of the Northbank Riverwalk is the Landing. In 2002, the Jacksonville Track Club partnered with the city in commissioning The Runner, a statue of a sprinting man on the riverwalk.

Gallery

See also
 Downtown Jacksonville
 Jacksonville Landing

References

External links
Southbank Riverwalk Official website
Northbank Riverwalk Official website

Tourist attractions in Jacksonville, Florida
Buildings and structures in Jacksonville, Florida
Redeveloped ports and waterfronts in the United States
Parks in Jacksonville, Florida
Downtown Jacksonville
Northbank, Jacksonville
Southbank, Jacksonville
Brooklyn, Jacksonville
1985 establishments in Florida